Louis Archambault  (April 4, 1915 – January 27, 2003) was a Quebec sculptor and ceramicist, who was one of the members of the "new sculpture" movement in Canada that moved away from traditional methods towards abstraction.

Career
Born in Montreal, Quebec, he received his BA from the University of Montreal in 1936 and a diploma in ceramics from the École des Beaux Arts, Montreal in 1939, becoming an instructor in sculpture at the École in 1949. In 1952, he exhibited his work at the then Art Gallery of Toronto with Alfred Pellan. In 1953, he won a Canadian Government Fellowship to study in Paris and Venice. In 1956, works by Archambault along with those of Jack Shadbolt and Harold Town represented Canada at the Venice Biennale. He was commissioned in 1957 to make a ceramic wall for the Canadian pavilion at the Brussels International and Universal Exposition in 1958. In 1958, he won the Royal Architectural Institute of Canada's Allied Arts Medal.

His work is in such public collections in Canada as the National Gallery of Canada, the Art Gallery of Ontario and the Robert McLaughlin Gallery in Oshawa. His completed commissions include sculptures for the Pearson International Airport, Malton, Ontario; the Ottawa airport; Expo ’67, Montreal and Queen`s Park, Toronto. He was a member of the Royal Canadian Academy of Arts. In 1968, he was made an Officer of the Order of Canada.

After his death in 2003, he was entombed at the Notre Dame des Neiges Cemetery in Montreal.

References

Bibliography

External links
 Louis Archambault at The Canadian Encyclopedia

1915 births
2003 deaths
Canadian ceramists
Artists from Montreal
Sculptors from Quebec
French Quebecers
Officers of the Order of Canada
Modern sculptors
20th-century Canadian sculptors
Canadian male sculptors
20th-century Canadian male artists
Burials at Notre Dame des Neiges Cemetery